The 2004–05 USHL season is the 26th season of the United States Hockey League as an all-junior league. The regular season began on September 24, 2004, and concluded on April 2, 2005, with the regular season champion winning the Anderson Cup. The 2004–05 season was the first for the Indiana Ice who moved from Danville, Illinois, after their first season in the USHL. Two years after being named the River City Lancers, the franchise in Omaha, Nebraska, returned to their original name of Omaha Lancers.

The Clark Cup playoffs features the top four teams from each division competing for the league title.

Regular season
Final standings

Note: GP = Games played; W = Wins; L = Losses; OTL = Overtime losses; SL = Shootout losses; GF = Goals for; GA = Goals against; PTS = Points; x = clinched playoff berth; y = clinched division title; z = clinched league title

East Division

West Division

Clark Cup playoffs

Players

Scoring leaders

Leading goaltenders

Awards
Coach of the Year: Mark Carlson Cedar Rapids RoughRiders
Curt Hammer Award: Christian Hanson Tri-City Storm
Defenseman of the Year: Brett Motherwell Omaha Lancers
Forward of the Year: Dan Riedel Lincoln Stars
General Manager of the Year: Mike Hastings Omaha Lancers
Goaltender of the Year: Jeff Lerg Omaha Lancers
Organization of the Year: Waterloo Black Hawks
Player of the Year: Jeff Lerg Omaha Lancers
Rookie of the Year: Chad Rau Des Moines Buccaneers

References

External links
 Official website of the United States Hockey League
2004-05 USHL Season (Hockey DB)
2004-05 USHL Season (Elite Prospects)

USHL
United States Hockey League seasons